Mullion is a locality in the Southern Tablelands of New South Wales, Australia in the Yass Valley Shire. It lies north-west of Canberra on the western side of the Murrumbidgee River. It had a public school from 1959 to 1972. The locality is located in the Umburra parish of Cowley County, with a small part of it in Mullion parish, which lies further west.

References

Localities in New South Wales
Yass Valley Council
Southern Tablelands